Motley is a city in Cass and Morrison counties in the U.S. state of Minnesota.  The population was 680 at the 2020 census.  The main part of Motley is located within Morrison County; only a minor part of the city extends into Cass County 

The Cass County portion of Motley is part of the Brainerd Micropolitan Statistical Area.

History
Motley was laid out in 1874. A post office has been in operation at Motley since 1873.

In 1881, the Northern Pacific Railway built a 20’ x 40’ passenger station on the east side of 2nd Street (between Front Street and Main Street) and built a 24’ x 60’ freight depot on the west side of 2nd Street. A spur line ran south from the mainline along 4th Avenue to a planing mill that was located on the bank of the Long Prairie River (just south of Cemetery Road). The spur line was removed by 1920.

Geography

U.S. Highway 10 and Minnesota State Highways 64 and 210 are three of the main routes in the city.

Demographics

2010 census
As of the census of 2010, there were 671 people, 305 households, and 167 families living in the city. The racial makeup of the city was 94.5% White, 0.1% African American, 0.4% Native American, 1.6% from other races, and 3.3% from two or more races. Hispanic or Latino of any race were 4.3% of the population.

There were 305 households, of which 26.9% had children under the age of 18 living with them, 36.7% were married couples living together, 14.8% had a female householder with no husband present, 3.3% had a male householder with no wife present, and 45.2% were non-families. 38.7% of all households were made up of individuals, and 17.1% had someone living alone who was 65 years of age or older. The average household size was 2.20 and the average family size was 2.90.

The median age in the city was 41.1 years. 23.5% of residents were under the age of 18; 10.1% were between the ages of 18 and 24; 19.7% were from 25 to 44; 25.1% were from 45 to 64; and 21.6% were 65 years of age or older. The gender makeup of the city was 48.6% male and 51.4% female.

2000 census
As of the census of 2000, there were 585 people, 258 households, and 167 families living in the city. The racial makeup of the city was 97.95% White, 0.17% African American, 0.17% Native American, 0.34% Asian, 0.17% from other races, and 1.20% from two or more races. Hispanic or Latino of any race were 2.05% of the population.

There were 258 households, out of which 31.8% had children under the age of 18 living with them, 40.7% were married couples living together, 19.0% had a female householder with no husband present, and 34.9% were non-families. 31.0% of all households were made up of individuals, and 16.3% had someone living alone who was 65 years of age or older.  The average household size was 2.25 and the average family size was 2.73.

In the city, the population was spread out, with 27.7% under the age of 18, 10.8% from 18 to 24, 24.8% from 25 to 44, 18.6% from 45 to 64, and 18.1% who were 65 years of age or older.  The median age was 33 years. For every 100 females, there were 82.2 males.  For every 100 females age 18 and over, there were 75.5 males.

The median income for a household in the city was $23,438, and the median income for a family was $29,659. Males had a median income of $24,063 versus $18,824 for females. The per capita income for the city was $12,220.  About 19.2% of families and 18.9% of the population were below the poverty line, including 31.9% of those under age 18 and 17.1% of those age 65 or over.

References

External links
City Website

 

Cities in Minnesota
Cities in Morrison County, Minnesota
Cities in Cass County, Minnesota
Brainerd, Minnesota micropolitan area